Facial identification may refer to:

 Face#Perception and recognition
 Face perception
 Wanted poster
 Facial composite
 E-FIT - composite system
 Forensic facial reconstruction
 Facial recognition system 
 Next Generation Identification
 Automatic identification and data capture

Misidentification

 Cross-race effect
 Bell's palsy